The Triple J's Impossible Music Festival is a recurring event that has been broadcast on Australia's Triple J radio station over 55-hour periods in 2005, 2006, 2007 and 2008.   Each event comprises 55 live music recordings from Triple J's music archives.  The first went to air over 26–29 August 2005, to celebrate the 30 years worth of live music recorded by Triple J.  The second was broadcast over 6–9 October 2006. The third was aired over 25–27 May 2007. The fourth was recently aired across 19–21 September 2008.

The lineup is selected by Triple J listeners voting for over 1000 live recordings made by Triple J.  The recordings included music from festivals, concerts, smaller pub gigs, bands playing live in the studio, and some special events where listeners were able to win tickets to see the band for free in a secret location.

2005
One live set was played every hour between 6pm on Friday 26th, and 1am on Monday 29 August.  The following is the order in which the broadcasts went to air; the details in the brackets denotes the location and date in which the live recording was made.

Lineup

Friday
 The White Stripes (Livid, Sydney, 10 October 2003)
 Silverchair (Homebake, Byron Bay, 4 January 1996)
 Muse (Hordern Pavilion, Sydney, 10 September 2004)
 Violent Femmes (The Palace, Melbourne, 8 November 1990)
 Franz Ferdinand (Splendour in the Grass, Byron Bay, 24 July 2004)
 The Living End (Triple J rooftop, Sydney, 16 November 1998)

Saturday
 The Smashing Pumpkins (Overseas Passenger Terminal, Sydney's Circular Quay, 19 June 1998)
 Split Enz (Comb & Cutter Hotel, Blacktown, Sydney, 21 December 1979)
 The Mars Volta (Big Day Out, Sydney, 23 January 2004)
 Grinspoon (Triple J rooftop, Sydney, 15 November 1999)
 Green Day (Goat Island, Sydney, 19 October 2000)
 The Strokes (Triple J Studio 227, Sydney, 24 July 2001)
 John Butler Trio (ABC Iwaki Auditorium, Melbourne, 12 October 2001)
 The Flaming Lips (Big Day Out, Sydney, 24 January 2004)
 Red Hot Chili Peppers (Big Day Out, Melbourne, 31 January 2000)
 Missy Higgins (ABC Iwaki Auditorium, Melbourne, 1 November 2004)
 Beastie Boys (Summersault, Sydney, 31 December 1995)
 INXS (Caringbah Inn, Sydney, 1982)
 Jeff Buckley (Phoenician Club, Sydney, 6 September 1995)
 The Cat Empire (Meredith Music Festival, Meredith, 13 December 2003)
 Queens of the Stone Age (Big Day Out, Melbourne, January 2001)
 Nick Cave & The Bad Seeds (Big Day Out, Melbourne, January 1993)
 Coldplay (Splendour in the Grass, Byron Bay, 20 July 2003)
 Foo Fighters (Festival Hall, Melbourne, 22 March 1998)
 Hilltop Hoods (UniBar, University of Adelaide, Adelaide, 3 November 2001)
 Rage Against the Machine (El Rey Theatre, Hollywood, October 1999)
 AC/DC (Haymarket, Sydney, 1977)
 The Chemical Brothers (Big Day Out Boiler Room, Sydney, 26 January 2000)
 The Ramones (Capitol Theatre, Sydney, 1980)
 Shihad (Triple J Studios, Melbourne, 27 September 1999)

Sunday
 Michael Franti and Spearhead (The Palace, Melbourne, 20 July 2001)
 Powderfinger (Triple J Studio 227, Sydney, 12 October 1998)
 Beck (Triple J Studio 227, Sydney, 21 August 1994)
 The Cure (Capitol Theatre, Sydney, 1981)
 The Dandy Warhols (Corner Hotel, Melbourne, 30 October 2000)
 Interpol (Triple J Studio 227, Sydney, 11 August 2003)
 The Killers (Enmore Theatre, Sydney, 18 December 2004)
 Ben Folds Five (Triple J Studio 227, Sydney, 29 July 1998)
 Crowded House (Transformers, Melbourne, 28 July 1991)
 At the Drive-In (Triple J Studio 227, Sydney, 22 January 2001)
 PJ Harvey (Big Day Out, Melbourne, 26 January 2001)
 Pearl Jam (Melbourne Park, Melbourne, 5 March 1998)
 Frenzal Rhomb (Triple J Studio 227, Sydney, 12 May 2003)
 Fatboy Slim (Big Day Out Boiler Room, Sydney, January 2001)
 Ben Harper (SBW Independent Theatre, Sydney, 11 April 2001)
 You Am I (Triple J Studio 227, Sydney, 20 April 1998)
 Midnight Oil (Royal Antler Hotel, Sydney, 2 May 1980)
 System of a Down (Big Day Out, Gold Coast, January 2002)
 Faithless (Hordern Pavilion, Sydney, 8 October 2004)
 Nirvana (The Palace, Melbourne, 1 February 1992)
 Placebo (Hordern Pavilion, Sydney, 19 March 2004)
 Garbage (Davies Park, Brisbane, 5 October 1996)
 Faith No More (Festival Hall, Melbourne, 14 August 1995)
 Metallica (Big Day Out, Sydney, 23 January 2004)

Monday
 Tom Waits (State Theatre, Sydney, 2 May 1979)

Announcers
 Friday 6pm10pm - Rosie Beaton
 Friday 10pmSaturday 1am - Robbie Buck
 Saturday 1am6am - Nicole Foote
 Saturday 6am10am - Scott Dooley
 Saturday 10am2pm - Zan Rowe
 Saturday 2pm6pm - Maya Jupiter
 Saturday 6pm10pm - Gaby Brown
 Saturday 10pmSunday 1am - Nicole Foote
 Sunday 1am6am - Dave Callan
 Sunday 6am10am - Scott Dooley
 Sunday 10am2pm - Zan Rowe
 Sunday 2pm5pm - Maya Jupiter
 Sunday 5pm9pm - Richard Kingsmill
 Sunday 9pmMonday 1am - Fenella Kernebone

2006
The 2006 Impossible Music Festival was broadcast over the weekend of 6 October-8 October.

Lineup

Friday
The Hives (Big Day Out, Sydney, 2005)
Spiderbait (Revolver Nightclub, Melbourne, 2001)
Wolfmother (Studio 22, ABC TV, Sydney, 2005)
Hilltop Hoods (Cable Beach, Broome, 2006)
Placebo (Hordern Pavilion, Sydney, 2004)
Red Hot Chili Peppers (Sydney Entertainment Centre, Sydney, 1996)

Saturday
Groove Armada (Forum Theatre, Melbourne, 2002)
Foo Fighters (Studio 227, ABC, Sydney, 2002)
The Waifs (Iwaki Auditorium, ABC, Melbourne, 2002)
Yeah Yeah Yeahs (ABC TV studios, Melbourne, 2006)
Crowded House (Transformers, Melbourne, 1991)
Butterfingers (Corner Hotel, Melbourne, 2006)
The Whitlams (Studio 227, Sydney, 1998)
The White Stripes (Studio 227, Sydney, 2002)
Rose Tattoo (Mount Druitt, Sydney, 1980)
The Shins (Meredith Music Festival, 2004)
Kaiser Chiefs (The Metro Theatre, Sydney, 2005)
Ben Folds Five (Studio 227, Sydney, 1998)
Nirvana (The Palace, Melbourne, 1992)
Muse (Studio 346, Melbourne, 2000)
Cog (ANU, Canberra, 2005)
Eskimo Joe (Studio 227, Sydney, 2004)
Regurgitator (Darwin, 1997)
silverchair (Studio 227, Sydney, 2002)
The Grates (The Metro Theatre, Sydney, 2006)
Jurassic 5 (Splendour in the Grass, Byron Bay, 2004)
New Order (Big Day Out, Gold Coast, 2002)
Bloc Party (Splendour in the Grass, Byron Bay, 2005)
N*E*R*D (Enmore Theatre, Sydney, 2004)
Basement Jaxx (Big Day Out Boiler Room, Sydney, 2000)

Sunday
The Flaming Lips (Big Day Out, Sydney, 2004)
Pearl Jam (Rod Laver Arena, Melbourne, 1998)
Gyroscope (ABC Studios, Perth, 2004)
The Strokes (The Gaelic Club, Sydney, 2005)
The Ramones (Capitol Theatre, Sydney, Sydney, 1980)
Custard (Studio 227, Sydney, 1997)
The Black Keys (Studio 227, Sydney, 2003)
Ween (Livid, Brisbane, 1993)
The Tea Party (Enmore Theatre, Sydney, 1999)
Death Cab for Cutie (Studio 227, Sydney, 2003)
Jeff Buckley (Phoenician Club, Sydney, 1995)
Talking Heads (State Theatre, Sydney, 1979)
Powderfinger (Forum Theatre, Melbourne, 2000)
Blur (1997)
Xavier Rudd (Iwaki Theatre, Melbourne, 2004)
AC/DC (Haymarket, Sydney, 1975)
Machine Gun Fellatio (2001)
Gomez (Enmore Theatre, Sydney, 2004)
The Herd (Newcastle Leagues Club, Newcastle, 2005)
Kings of Leon (Big Day Out, Sydney, 2006)
The Smashing Pumpkins (Studio 227, Sydney, 1996)
The Killers (Enmore Theatre, Sydney, 2005)
Beastie Boys (Big Day Out, Sydney, 2005)
Underworld (The Metro Theatre, Melbourne, 2003)

Monday
Nick Cave and the Bad Seeds (Big Day Out, Melbourne, 1996)

Announcers
 Friday 6pm10pm - Rosie Beaton
 Friday 10pmSaturday 1am - Sharif Galal
 Saturday 1am6am - Nicole Foote
 Saturday 6am10am - Scott Dooley
 Saturday 10am2pm - Zan Rowe
 Saturday 2pm6pm - Gaby Brown
 Saturday 6pm9pm - Dave Callan
 Saturday 9pmSunday 1am - Nicole Foote
 Sunday 1am6am - Kara Kidman
 Sunday 6am10am - Scott Dooley
 Sunday 10am2pm - Zan Rowe
 Sunday 2pm6pm - Gaby Brown
 Sunday 6pm10pm - Kirileigh Lynch
 Sunday 10pmMonday 2am - Fenella Kernebone

2007
The 2007 Impossible Music Festival was broadcast over the weekend of 25 May-27 May.

Lineup

Friday
Kings of Leon (Big Day Out, Sydney, 2006)
Lyrics Born (Prince of Wales, Melbourne, 2005)
The Police (1979)
Supergrass (2000)
The Dresden Dolls (2006)
The Used (2004)
Itch-E and Scratch-E (1995)

Saturday
Futureheads (Splendour in the Grass, Byron Bay, 2005)
Apollo 440 (2000)
The Herd (Newcastle Leagues Club, Newcastle, 2005)
Warumpi Band (1998)
Primal Scream (1995)
Martha Wainwright (2005)
Snow Patrol (Splendour in the Grass, Byron Bay, 2006)
Ian Dury and The Blockheads (1981)
Resin Dogs (2000)
Ash (1996)
Missy Higgins (Iwaki Auditorium, ABC, Melbourne, 2004)
Radio Birdman (1977)
The Cat Empire (2005)
Arctic Monkeys (2006)
Billy Bragg (1977)
Blues Explosion (2005)
Carl Cox (2001)
Sharon Jones & The Dap-Kings (2006)
Black Keys (2003)
The Grates (The Metro Theatre, Sydney, 2006)
AC/DC (Haymarket, Sydney, 1975)
Basement Jaxx (2006)
Iggy & The Stooges (2006)
Mars Volta (2003)

Sunday
Fatboy Slim (1999)
Lily Allen (2007)
Downsyde (2003)
Hoodoo Gurus (1984)
Interpol (2003)
John Cale (1983)
Bright Eyes (2005)
Moby (Splendour in the Grass, Byron Bay, 2005)
Tegan and Sara (2006)
XTC (1980)
Wolfmother (ABC TV studios, Sydney, 2005)
Mylo (2005)
Faith No More (1990)
Hilltop Hoods (2004)
Bernard Fanning (2005)
Moloko (2004)
Midnight Oil (1982)
 The White Stripes (Livid, Sydney, 10 October 2003)
 Faithless (Hordern Pavilion, Sydney, 8 October 2004)
 Gary Numan (1980)
 Metallica (Big Day Out, Sydney, 23 January 2004)
The Bens (2003)
Hole (1995)

Monday
Dirty Three (2004)

Announcers
 Friday 6pm10pm - Rosie Beaton
 Friday 10pmSaturday 1am - Jem Gold
 Saturday 1am6am - Nicole Foote
 Saturday 6am10am - Scott Dooley
 Saturday 10am2pm - Vijay Khurana
 Saturday 2pm6pm - Gaby Brown
 Saturday 6pmSunday 1am - Liza Harvey
 Sunday 1am6am - Sam Simmons
 Sunday 6am10am - Scott Dooley
 Sunday 10am2pm - Vijay Khurana
 Sunday 2pm6pm - Amy Blackmur
 Sunday 6pm10pm - Richard Kingsmill
 Sunday 10pmMonday 2am - Fenella Kernebone

2008
The 2008 Impossible Music Festival was broadcast over the weekend of 19 September-21 September.

Lineup

Friday
Kings of Leon 
Rage Against the Machine 
2 Many DJ's 
Spiderbait
Jurassic 5 
Ramones
The Gossip

Saturday
Ben Folds Five 
Franz Ferdinand 
Blink 182 
Propellerheads
José González 
The Shins
Cold Chisel
Amy Winehouse
Cold War Kids 
Pixies  
Beastie Boys 
The Triffids 
Nirvana 
Klaxons 
Silverchair 
Crowded House 
Tegan and Sara 
Hilltop Hoods 
Fatboy Slim 
Bloc Party 
James Murphy
Busy P 
Muph and Plutonic

Sunday
The Cat Empire 
Arctic Monkeys
Aphex Twin 
Died Pretty 
Xavier Rudd 
Air 
Sunnyboys 
Björk 
Radiohead 
Foo Fighters 
New Order 
N*E*R*D 
Muse 
Hunters and Collectors 
Yeah Yeah Yeahs 
The Presets 
Arcade Fire 
The Chemical Brothers 
The Cure 
The Verve 
Cut Copy 
Talking Heads 
Jeff Buckley

Announcers
 Friday 6pm10pm - Rosie Beaton
 Friday 10pmSaturday 1am - Will Styles & Learned Hand
 Saturday 1am6am - Nicole Foote
 Saturday 6am10am - Sam Simmons
 Saturday 10am2pm - Brendan Maclean
 Saturday 2pm6pm - Rosie Beaton
 Saturday 6pm9pm - Kirileigh Lynch
 Saturday 9pmSunday 1am - Nicole Foote
 Sunday 1am6am - Dave Callan
 Sunday 6am10am - Sam Simmons
 Sunday 10am2pm - Brendan Maclean
 Sunday 2pm6pm - Rosie Beaton
 Sunday 6pm10pm - Richard Kingsmill
 Sunday 10pmMonday 1am - Fenella Kernebone

2009
There was no Impossible Music Festival in 2009 due to the Hottest 100 of All Time.

2010
Triple J asked their listeners who their favourite live acts ever are, this is the result:

 Muse
 Rage Against the Machine
 Daft Punk
 Bloc Party
 Art vs. Science
 The Cat Empire
 Vampire Weekend
 Hilltop Hoods
 The Presets
 Yeah Yeah Yeahs
 Foo Fighters
 John Butler Trio
 The Flaming Lips
 Pearl Jam
 The Prodigy
 Florence and the Machine
 Phoenix
 Grinspoon
 Tool
 Radiohead

External links
 Triple J's Impossible Music Festival

Music festivals in Australia
Triple J programs